Szostak is a gender-neutral Polish surname that may refer to
Alex Szostak (born 1986), Scottish rugby league footballer
Edward Szostak (1911–1990), Polish basketball player
Jack W. Szostak (born 1952), Canadian-American biologist of Polish-British descent
Michał Szostak (born 1980), Polish organist, researcher, doctor of music arts
Stanisław Szostak (1898–1961), Polish military officer
Stéphanie Szostak (born 1975), French actress 
Wit Szostak (born 1976), Polish fantasy writer, philosopher and historian of Polish music folklore

See also
 
Shostak

Polish-language surnames